Schwendtner is a surname. Notable people with this surname include:

 Jozef Schwendtner (born 1963), Slovak wrestler
 Susanne Schwendtner, Austrian para table tennis player